This was the second of two editions of the tournament in the 2021 tennis season. Marc-Andrea Hüsler and Zdeněk Kolář were the defending champions but only Kolář chose to defend his title, partnering Julien Cagnina. Kolář lost in the final to Raven Klaasen and Ruan Roelofse.

Klaasen and Roelofse won the title after defeating Cagnina and Kolář 6–4, 6–4 in the final.

Seeds

Draw

References

External links
 Main draw

Potchefstroom Open II - Doubles